The Mulk caretaker ministry is the Pakistani caretaker federal cabinet that was sworn into office on 5 June 2018.

References

2018 establishments in Pakistan
Cabinets established in 2018
2010s in Pakistani politics